Chersotis ebertorum is a moth of the family Noctuidae. It is found in the eastern part of Turkey, Iran, Transcaucasia and the Levant.

Adults are on wing from May to June. There is one generation per year.

External links
 Noctuinae of Israel

Noctuinae
Moths of Asia